Ben Comeau (born 1993) is a British composer, pianist and organist, whose work combines classical, jazz and contemporary music.

Biography
Comeau was born in 1993 and grew up in Truro, Cornwall. As a child, he sang with the choir at Truro Cathedral, becoming interested in Bach and jazz music. He obtained an LRSM diploma with distinction in piano, and a Royal College of Organists diploma. In 2011, he won the first Northern Ireland International Organ Competition, playing his own arrangement of Igor Stravinsky's Firebird Suite. He studied at Girton College, Cambridge, where he was the college organ scholar, and graduated with a Bachelor of Arts in music in 2014. He gained a postgraduate degree in music from the Guildhall School of Music and Drama.

Comeau's concerts mix classical, jazz and contemporary music including Björk and Pink Floyd. In 2015, he composed and performed a 45-minute piano sonata in the style of a fictitious student of Franz Liszt in the 1880s. He has composed and performed several works for BBC Radio Three, playing piano and organ.

In 2018, Comeau uploaded to YouTube a four-part fugue arranged for soprano, alto, tenor and bass with the words "Donald Trump is a Wanker", set to the tune of The White Stripes' "Seven Nation Army". He sold the fugue's score online, with proceeds going towards "organisations combating the more odious policies of the Trump administration." He uploaded a similar fugue to YouTube the following year, "Boris Johnson is a Lying Shit" in the run up to the 2019 general election. The video had been played over 100,000 times by election day.

References

External links
 "Donald Trump is a Wanker" - fugue
 "Boris Johnson is a Lying Shit" - fugue

Alumni of the Guildhall School of Music and Drama
Alumni of the Royal Academy of Music
British classical composers
British classical pianists
British organists